Eddy Lembo (born 10 November 1980) is a French-Algerian former professional road cyclist.

Major results
1997
 2nd Road race, French National Junior Road Championships
1998
 1st Overall Tour de Lorraine
2001
 1st Tour du Doubs
 3rd Tro-Bro Léon
 6th Grand Prix de Wallonie
2002
 1st Stage 1 Tour de Suisse
 3rd Tour du Finistère
 4th A Travers le Morbihan
 6th Route Adélie
2003
 7th Sparkassen Giro Bochum
2004
 10th GP de Villers-Cotterêts
2008
 1st Stage 1 Tour de Guadeloupe
2009
 1st Stage 1 Tour du Conseil général de Guadeloupe
 1st Stage 1 Tour de Marie Galante

References

External links

1980 births
Living people
French male cyclists
Algerian male cyclists
21st-century Algerian people
Tour de Suisse stage winners